Sarah Payne is a British actress and singer. She has worked extensively in London's West End, and has played various roles in theatre, comedy, musical theatre, and opera.

Payne initially trained as a musician, and studied music at Durham University. She was offered a part in a musical, and within two years she received a Best Actress of the Year in a Musical Olivier Award nomination for creating the role of Lina Lamont in Singin' in the Rain (1983) at London's Palladium Theatre.

Her major theatre credits also include such shows as The Rocky Horror Show (1979), Barnum (1981), Cricket (1986), The Mystery of Edwin Drood (1987), Risky Kisses (1990), The Marriage of Figaro (1991), Showtune (1998, then titled The Best of Times), High Spirits (2001), and Follies (2006). She also appeared in the 1985 Royal Variety Performance.

Payne sings on the 1986 studio cast recording of the concept musical Josephine, and on the 1992 London concert album of Nine. She sang Donna Elvira in Don Giovanni at the Greenwich Theatre in 1990.

References

Other sources
Sarah Payne CV from 2004
Sarah Payne at Theatricalia

External links
Sarah Payne film and television acting credits at the BFI

Year of birth missing (living people)
Living people
British stage actresses
British musical theatre actresses
British television actresses
English operatic sopranos
20th-century British women opera singers
21st-century British women opera singers
20th-century English actresses
21st-century English actresses
Alumni of Durham University